The 1788 election held in the Polish–Lithuanian Commonwealth marked one of the most crucial events in the history of both countries prior to 1795. The elections returned a significant pro-reform camp to the Sejm of the Polish–Lithuanian Commonwealth chosen to repair the Commonwealth's political system and prevent the country from collapsing. The Sejm that emerged as a result of the election has been dubbed the Great Sejm.

Background
The election was called by the King in May 1788 and the Sejmiks gathered to elect the deputies in August. The Sejm gathered on 28 September.

Sejmik Districts

See also 
History of Poland in the Early Modern era (1569–1795)
Great Sejm

References
U. Augustyniak, Historia Polski 1572-1795, Warszawa 2008
M. Markiewicz, Historia Polski 1494-1795, Kraków 2002

1788 elections
18th-century elections in Europe
1788 in the Polish–Lithuanian Commonwealth